Same-sex marriage has been legal in Tlaxcala since 25 December 2020. Legislation to legalise same-sex marriage passed the Congress of Tlaxcala on 8 December 2020 by a vote of 16–3, and came into force on 25 December. Tlaxcala has also recognised civil unions, which grant several of the rights and benefits of marriage, for both opposite-sex and same-sex couples since 12 January 2017.

Legal history

Background

The Mexican Supreme Court ruled on 12 June 2015 that state bans on same-sex marriage are unconstitutional nationwide. The court's ruling is considered a "jurisprudential thesis" and did not invalidate state laws, meaning that same-sex couples denied the right to marry would still have to seek individual amparos in court. The ruling standardized the procedures for judges and courts throughout Mexico to approve all applications for same-sex marriages and made the approval mandatory. The court based its decision on Articles 1 and 4 of the Constitution of Mexico. Article 1 of the Constitution states that "any form of discrimination, based on ethnic or national origin, gender, age, disabilities, social status, medical conditions, religion, opinions, sexual orientation, marital status, or any other form, which violates the human dignity or seeks to annul or diminish the rights and freedoms of the people, is prohibited.", while Article 4 respects matrimonial equality: "Man and woman are equal under the law. The law shall protect the organization and development of the family".

In late June 2015, 15 same-sex couples applied for marriage licenses at civil registry offices in the state, but all were rejected. With the help of the State Human Rights Commission, they filed amparos in court. On 27 November 2015, a federal court granted an amparo to one of the couples. Their marriage, which was the first same-sex marriage in Tlaxcala, took place on 18 January 2016 in Ixtenco. The amparo was only granted after the Commission had interceded on their behalf.

Legislative action

Civil unions
In February 2014, Deputy Eréndira Montiel Jiménez from the Party of the Democratic Revolution (PRD) promised to introduce a partnership bill to the Congress of Tlaxcala. The proposed legislation, introduced on 3 April 2014, outlined the legal framework for a form of coexistence "that has the purpose of marriage or concubinage". On 29 December 2016, Congress approved the coexistence bill by 18 votes to 4. Two deputies from the National Action Party (PAN) walked out in protest as the voting took place. The bill established an institution called , which provides cohabiting same-sex and opposite-sex couples with many of the rights and obligations of marriage. The law was published in the official state journal on 11 January 2017, following Governor Marco Antonio Mena Rodríguez's signature, and took effect the following day.

Same-sex marriage
A bill to legalize same-sex marriage was presented to the Congress of Tlaxcala on 2 October 2009. The proposal was blocked by state lawmakers in 2010, and the state, along with officials from Guanajuato, Jalisco, Morelos and Sonora, filed a formal court challenge to the passage of a same-sex marriage law in Mexico City. In June 2011, activists questioned why no action had been taken on the bill and were told that it was still "climbing the roster." Deputy María Antonieta Stankiewicz Ramírez from the Institutional Revolutionary Party (PRI) announced that a same-sex marriage bill would be debated in a Congress committee sometime in July 2016, though no vote happened. On 13 October 2017, the New Alliance Party introduced a new same-sex marriage bill to Congress.

The July 2018 elections resulted in the National Regeneration Movement (MORENA) and the Labor Party (PT) winning the majority of legislative seats in Congress. Both parties expressed support for the legalization of same-sex marriage in their party platforms. In October 2018, Deputy Miguel Ángel Covarrubias Cervantes from the Party of the Democratic Revolution introduced a same-sex marriage bill to Congress. The legislation was approved by a 16–3 vote on 8 December 2020. It was published in the official state journal on 24 December, following the signature of Governor Mena Rodríguez, and took effect the following day.

The law amended article 42 of the Civil Code to read:
 in Spanish: El matrimonio es la unión de dos personas con su pleno consentimiento, que tiene como objeto realizar la comunidad de vida, en donde ambas se procuran respeto, igualdad y ayuda mutua. Debe celebrarse ante los funcionarios que establece la ley y con todas las solemnidades que ella exige.
 (Marriage is the union of two people with their full consent, whose objective is achieving a community of life, where both partners seek respect, equality and mutual aid. Marriages must be solemnized by the officials established by law and with all the solemnities that it requires.)

Marriage statistics
The following table shows the number of same-sex marriages performed in Tlaxcala since 2021 as reported by the National Institute of Statistics and Geography.

Public opinion
A 2017 opinion poll conducted by Gabinete de Comunicación Estratégica found that 51% of Tlaxcala residents supported same-sex marriage, while 48% were opposed.

According to a 2018 survey by the National Institute of Statistics and Geography, 44% of the Tlaxcala public opposed same-sex marriage.

See also
Same-sex marriage in Mexico
LGBT rights in Mexico

Notes

References

Tlaxcala
Tlaxcala
2020 in LGBT history